Jannée Castle is a castle in Jannée in the village of Pessoux, municipality of Ciney, province of Namur, Wallonia, Belgium.

See also
List of castles in Belgium

Sources
 Château de Jannée official website 

Castles in Belgium
Castles in Namur (province)
Ciney